

A13A Tonics
This group is empty.

References

A13